Umut Aral (born 26 June 1976) is a Turkish film director, producer, and screenwriter best known for the Netflix Original The Protector., Love 101 and his feature debut on esports 'Good Game: The Beginning'.

Early life
Umut Aral was raised in Istanbul, Turkey. He attended Galatasaray High School and studied management at Boğaziçi University. 
He began making filmmaking at a young age. Started shooting short films at the age of thirteen.  He can speak English, French and Turkish.

Career
He is an established director in the commercial world, directed 300+ TV commercials, working for clients such as Coca-Cola, Pepsi, Mercedes-Benz, McDonald's, Nivea, Vodafone, Unilever, Nestle Nutricia and QMobile.

In 2017 Aral directed a docudrama for Galatasaray S.K. Museum. and also one episode of Turkish streaming platform BluTV original anthology series 7 Faces which is currently streaming on SBS Australia and HBOMax Latam.

In 2018, Aral directed the first Turkish language Netflix Series The Protector starring Çağatay Ulusoy, Ayca Aysin Turan, Hazar Erguclu and Okan Yalıbık for 4 consecutive seasons. The Protector became the 6th of most watched ‘Non- English TV shows’ in UK and 10th in US. The same year he also directed the first licensed esports feature film Good Game: The Beginning starring Mert Yazıcıoğlu, Afra Saraçoğlu and Kerem Bürsin.

In 2020, Aral directed 4 episodes for the second and final season of Netflix Original Love 101 a Turkish teen comedy-drama, starring Mert Yazıcıoğlu, Kubilay Aka, Alina Boz, Selahattin Paşalı, İpek Filiz Yazıcı, Pınar Deniz, Kaan Urgancıoğlu and Ece Yüksel.

In 2022, he directed 4 episodes for Yakamoz S-245, the spin-off of Belgian apocalyptic sci-fi thriller Into The Night starring Kivanc Tatlitug, Ozge Ozpirincci and Ertan Saban. Yakamoz S-245 has been watched 22 million hours in four days following its global launch on Netflix. The series was reported to be the third most watched non-English TV series on Netflix.

He has been a speaker and educator, invited as a guest speaker to global organizations like YPO and by universities to run workshops on filmmaking.

Umut Aral is also The Chairman of Board of Members of Mithat Alam Education Foundation and Mithat Alam Film Center - the 'cinematheque', a prestigious cultural center in Istanbul.

Filmography

Awards

Good Game: The Beginning (2018)
Awards include Best Feature Film Award in Beirut International Children & Family Film Festival, Special Jury Remi Award (Family /Children Section) in WorldFest-Houston International Film Festival, Young Audience Award (Teen Arena) in Sarajevo International Film Festival, Award of Excellence Special Mention (Children / Family Programming) in Accolade Global Film Competition.

Crash (2006)
Awards include Best Director Award in L'Isola del Cinema Festival Del Corto, Global Audience Award in CON-CAN Movie Festival, Best Foreign Film Award in Action/Cut Short Film Competition, Best Fiction & Special Audience Awards in Boston Turkish Film Festival, Best Film Award in Metro Group National Short Film Competition, Best Film Golden Cat Award in Izmir International Short Film Festival, Jury Special Award in !f Istanbul AFM International Independent Film Festival and official selections in Locarno International Film Festival, Drama International Short Film Festival, Raindance Film Festival.

thirtyfour (2000)
Awards include Best Short Film Award in İFSAK Short Film Festival, Best Short Film Award in Cine5 National Short Film Competition and Best Short Film Award in Marmara University Short Film Competition.

External links
Official website

References

Turkish film directors